Pokémon Conquest, known in Japan as , is a 2012 tactical role-playing video game developed by Tecmo Koei, published by The Pokémon Company and distributed by Nintendo for the Nintendo DS. The game is a crossover between the Pokémon and Nobunaga's Ambition video game series. The game was released in Japan on March 17, 2012, in North America on June 18, 2012, and in Europe on July 27, 2012.

Gameplay

The gameplay is turn-based strategy and is a tactical RPG, unlike the main-series Pokémon games, with different Pokémon capable of using different attacks and means of movement. Warriors and Warlords also have unique battle-changing powers that boost their Pokémon's abilities but may only be used once per battle. These effects range from increased attacking power, health restoration, or even temporary invincibility.

Unlike in the main-series Pokémon games, each Pokémon is capable of using only one move. This move is determined by the Pokémon's species and is usually picked to represent that species; for example, Excadrill uses its trademark move Drill Run. Additionally, only a select fraction of the 649 Pokémon that existed at that time of release are available in the game. The main-series capture system is replaced by a minigame where a Warrior attempts to form a link with a wild Pokémon by coordinating button presses with a display, reminiscent of Dance Dance Revolution. The main-series leveling system is replaced by a concept called "link", a percentage which increases to a certain maximum, and reflects that Pokémon's battling statistics. Each Warrior has a natural affinity to certain types, which grants an increased maximum link with Pokémon of those types. In addition, every Warrior and Warlord has one evolutionary family of Pokémon with which they may form a 100%, or perfect, link. In addition, certain Warlords can form links with legendary Pokémon. A Warlord's costume almost always resembles the appearance of at least one of their "perfect link" species. Additionally, the main-series evolution system is changed to reflect the removal of Pokémon levels. Instead of a Pokémon reaching a specific level, they evolve by reaching certain conditions such as reaching a specific link or winning a battle in a specific kingdom. Warlords are also able to evolve by reaching certain conditions, such as achieving a certain link percent with a Pokémon.  Warlords, other than the player, cannot evolve until after completing the main story.

The various Warriors and Warlords in the game are named after figures in Japanese history, with the game's antagonist  being a take on the real historical figure Oda Nobunaga. After defeating Nobunaga and completing the main storyline, players can take on 36 special episodes, each featuring one of the other warlords and having different objectives (such as taking over a portion of Ransei rather than the whole region). They feature smarter AI (with the opposing nations attacking your countries more often), the ability to upgrade the locations within the regions through a bank to find more Pokémon or get better items and to evolve the rest of the Warlords. The episodes often reference real historical events, such as Mitsuhide's betrayal of Nobunaga and Hideyoshi's unification of most of Japan. After the episodes of the 16 senior warlords are completed, a final episode will be unlocked, which is essentially a new game with the main playable character but includes the added features of the post-game episodes.

Plot
A legend is foretold that the one who unifies all the 17 kingdoms of the  will have a chance to encounter the Legendary Pokémon who created the Ransei Region. Warriors and Warlords all over the region sought to fulfill the foretold legend, resulting in battles and an end to Ransei's peaceful era. The game initiates off with the player just becoming the Warlord of the  kingdom and is met by Oichi. Hideyoshi of the nearby kingdom of  sends his warriors to ambush Aurora, only for them to be defeated by the player and Oichi. Oichi explains to the player that all of the other kingdoms of Ransei had become aggressive and hostile towards one another, in their hopes of fulfilling the Ransei Legend. This initiates the player's harrowing journey of unifying other nations, starting with Ignis, hoping to restore peace upon Ransei.

Though his servant Ranmaru pleads with Oichi not to oppose him, Nobunaga states he will annihilate anyone who gets in his way. With Nobunaga and his Zekrom defeated, the player had united Ransei, and the Infinity Tower is revealed. Inside, the player's party finds the Mythical Pokémon Arceus. After linking with Arceus, the player is confronted again with Nobunaga, now partnered with a shiny Rayquaza, along with Mitsuhide, Ieyasu, Ranmaru, and Hideyoshi for a final battle. After being defeated, Nobunaga reveals his true intentions to bring peace to Ransei by destroying Arceus as it is the cause of the conflict. However, seeing the player unaffected by being linked to Arceus, and as the Pokémon takes its leave, Nobunaga relents as Ransei's kingdoms are restored to their proper owners and a system in the region is established.

Development
Pokémon + Nobunaga's Ambition was first revealed at the Shueisha's "Jump Festa" anime and manga event on December 17, 2011. Nintendo and Tecmo Koei announced the game during the event and announced its 2012 release. The Pokémon Company announced a live streaming event that would be used to reveal information to consumers in Japan, and it took place on January 19, 2012. Part of the character designs on the humans also worked on Samurai Warriors 3, with touch-ups from Ken Sugimori. On April 4, 2012, it was announced on Pokemon.com that Pokémon + Nobunaga's Ambition would be released in the United States on June 18, 2012, as Pokémon Conquest.

Reception

Pokémon Conquest received positive reviews, possessing a score of 80/100 on Metacritic. Famitsu gave the game a score of 34/40, with reviewers praising the game's accessibility for young players, high replay value, and ability to mix Pokémon with a traditional Japanese historical setting. IGN gave the game a score of 9 and an Editor's Choice award, praising its deep gameplay and calling it "one of the greatest, most fully realized Pokémon spinoffs in existence". Destructoid gave the game 8/10. Game Informer gave the game a 7/10.

The game sold 341,000 copies in Japan in 2012.

In 2012, IGN placed the Pokémon Conquest 12th on their "The Top 25 Nintendo DS Games"

References

Attribution

External links

  
  (US)
  (UK)

2012 video games
Crossover role-playing video games
Nintendo DS-only games
Nintendo DS games
Sengoku video games
Tactical role-playing video games
Koei Tecmo games
Video games developed in Japan
Video games featuring protagonists of selectable gender
Cultural depictions of Oda Nobunaga
Conquest